Holmes Park is a neighborhood of Kansas City, Missouri, United States.

Holmes Park was laid out in the 1880s, and named after Robert J. Holmes, an original owner of the site. A post office called Holmes Park was established in 1890, and remained in operation until 1955.

References

Neighborhoods in Kansas City, Missouri